Mark Morris (born 1 August 1968) is an English former professional footballer who played as a goalkeeper.

Career
Born in Chester, Morris played for Wrexham and Runcorn. While at Wrexham, he was Player of the Season during 1990–91.

He was released in the summer of 1994 and joined Runcorn. He later served as football in the community officer at Wrexham and rejoined the playing staff on non contract terms in 2001 as the club was suffering a financial crisis and were unable to bring in a goalkeeper on loan. He was named on the bench on a few occasions, but did not feature in a match. 

Morris currently serves as the goalkeeping coach for the Liverpool U23s and the Northern Ireland U17s, having previously coached at Wrexham, Chesterfield, Hereford and Southport.

References

1968 births
Living people
English footballers
Wrexham A.F.C. players
Runcorn F.C. Halton players
English Football League players
Association football goalkeepers
Sportspeople from Chester
Wrexham A.F.C. non-playing staff
Liverpool F.C. non-playing staff
Hereford F.C. non-playing staff
Chesterfield F.C. non-playing staff
Southport F.C. non-playing staff